Robert Englaro (born 28 August 1969) is a retired Slovenian football defender.

Englaro was capped 36 times for the Slovenian national team between 1992 and 1999.

See also
Slovenian international players

References

External links

1969 births
Living people
Sportspeople from Novo Mesto
Yugoslav footballers
Slovenian footballers
Association football defenders
NK Olimpija Ljubljana (1945–2005) players
Slovenian expatriate footballers
Slovenian expatriate sportspeople in Italy
Expatriate footballers in Italy
Serie A players
Serie B players
Calcio Foggia 1920 players
Atalanta B.C. players
NK Ljubljana players
Slovenian PrvaLiga players
Slovenia international footballers
Slovenian football managers